The Northern Kentucky Norse men's basketball statistical leaders are individual statistical leaders of the Northern Kentucky Norse men's basketball program in various categories, including points, assists, blocks, rebounds, and steals. Within those areas, the lists identify single-game, single-season, and career leaders. The Norse represent Northern Kentucky University (NKU) in the NCAA Division I Horizon League.

Northern Kentucky began competing in intercollegiate basketball in 1971. The Norse originally competed in the National Association of Intercollegiate Athletics (NAIA), later moving to NCAA Division II but maintaining their NAIA membership until aligning completely with the NCAA in the mid-1980s. NKU remained a D-II member until moving to Division I from the 2012–13 season. This history is significant because the official recording of statistics began at different times in different organizations, as well as different NCAA divisions.

The NAIA record books do not indicate when the organization began officially recording statistics on a national basis, but its current records (as of 2020–21) for single-game and single-season assists were both set in 1972–73, and the career record for blocks dates to 1975. The NCAA has recorded scoring statistics throughout the "modern era" of basketball, which it defines as starting with the 1937–38 season, the first after the center jump after each made field goal was abolished. Individual rebounding was first recorded in 1950–51, as were individual assists. While rebounding has been recorded in every subsequent season, the NCAA stopped recording individual assists after the 1951–52 season. Recording of assists resumed in D-I in 1983–84, but that statistic was not recorded in D-II until 1988–89. Similarly, while the NCAA started recording blocks and steals  in D-I in 1988–89, it did not record those statistics in D-II until 1992–93. NKU's record books include players in all named statistics, regardless of whether they were officially recorded by any of the governing bodies in which the school was a member.

These lists are updated through the end of the 2019–20 season.

Scoring

Rebounds

Assists

Steals

Blocks

References

Lists of college basketball statistical leaders by team
Statistical